Hoot was a British comic magazine that ran from (issues dates) 26 October 1985 to 25 October 1986, when it merged with The Dandy. Its cover price was 20p, represented by a stylized graphic depiction of a 20p coin. Throughout its run, it billed itself as "Britain's bubbling new comic!", a reference to the title masthead being made up of steam-billowing pipes (hence the title). The comic was the last new humour anthology comic from DC Thomson which mostly featured original characters.

List of Hoot comic strips
Strips throughout its 53 issue run included. Listed in order of appearance. All numbers refer to issues of Hoot.

List of Characters featured in Hoot mini-strips
The comic also featured short, four-frame strips featuring pre-existing DC Thomson characters, but few of these strips seemed to have been drawn by their "proper" artists, hence a rather odd-looking Lord Snooty. Below is a list of these four frame strips. These strips were drawn by George Martin and after Hoots merger with The Dandy they reappeared in The Dandy (still drawn by George Martin) under the title Comic Cuts and this time featured more Dandy characters than in Hoot.

References

See also
 List of DC Thomson Publications

DC Thomson Comics titles
Comics magazines published in the United Kingdom
Defunct British comics
British humour comics
1985 comics debuts
1986 comics endings
Magazines established in 1985
Magazines disestablished in 1986
1985 establishments in the United Kingdom